Many present-day naval vessels, aside from aircraft carriers and full-length deck amphibious assault ships, are capable of carrying aircraft. A majority of United States Navy ships have at least a helipad, capable of landing medium-sized helicopters. Many others have decks and even hangars incorporated into the structure of the ship. It has become a standard part of modern ship design to have a deck that supports multiple, medium or large helicopters, as well as being able to house them in a hangar, for protection and maintenance. Aside from carriers and full-length deck amphibious assault ships, the US Navy has 12 classes of commissioned surface warships, 10 of which are aviation-capable. Two of those classes, patrol ships and mine counter-measure ships, are due to be replaced by the littoral combat ship, at which point the entire US Naval surface war fleet will be aviation-capable.

US Navy ships
As of 2016, the current types and classes of US Navy ships, along with their capabilities are as follows:

Along with these types and classes, many of the US navy's non-commissioned ships, specifically those of the Military Sealift Command, are aviation-capable as well. The United States Coast Guard also has cutters that are aviation-capable. Also, with the growing technology in UAVs and UCAVs, virtually every ship afloat has, or will soon have, some type of aviation capability.

Other vessels
The following are examples of other types aviation-capable vessels from other navies around the world:

Other types
 Merchant aircraft carrier
 Submarine aircraft carrier
 Aircraft cruiser
 CAM ship
 Fighter catapult ship
 Interdiction Assault Ship
 Seaplane tender

See also

 List of current United States Navy ships
 List of Military Sealift Command ships
 United States Coast Guard Cutter
 Timeline for aircraft carrier service
 List of amphibious warfare ships
 List of aircraft carriers

References

External links

Ship types
Military helicopters